Francisco David González Borges (born 25 August 1981) is a Spanish footballer who plays as a midfielder for UD Tamaraceite.

Club career
González was born in Las Palmas, Canary Islands. He spent the vast majority of his career with UD Las Palmas, appearing in 200 matches in the Segunda División and also representing in the competition CD Numancia and AD Alcorcón.

Following a brief spell in the Segunda División B with Hércules CF, in September 2016 González signed with amateurs UD Tamaraceite in his native region. He helped them promote from the regional leagues to the third tier in only four years.

References

External links

1981 births
Living people
Spanish footballers
Footballers from Las Palmas
Association football midfielders
Segunda División players
Segunda División B players
Tercera División players
Segunda Federación players
Divisiones Regionales de Fútbol players
Universidad de Las Palmas CF footballers
UD Las Palmas Atlético players
UD Las Palmas players
CD Numancia players
AD Alcorcón footballers
Hércules CF players
UD Tamaraceite footballers